Klíče na neděli (Keys on Sunday) is a Czech comedy play by Antonín Procházka.

Plot 
Two couples met at an unsuccessful party. It is revealed that all four of them are in stereotypical marriages. They get drunk, swap partners and exchange keys.  A rich aunt comes from Switzerland, and after an awkward lunch with in-laws, a cuckolded husband arrives to punish his wife's infidelity, as well as the wife of an influential official who comes to save what she sees as her daughter's slumming. The plot gets complicated with many misunderstandings, and it can be regarded as a farce. The order is restored happily, even though everyone did not get what they wanted.

Characters 

Luisa Puckailerová
Ing. Jindřich Dostál
M.D. Irena Dostálová
Karel Kartouch
Dana Kartouchová
Jindřich's mother
Model
Lover
Husband
Ms. Urbanová

Productions 

A production opened at Branické Divadlo in Prague on June 5, 2008, directed by Antonín Procházka. Notable cast members included Milena Dvorská in the role of Luisa Puckailerová, and Mahulena Bočanová and Lucie Zedníčková, both of whom played Dana Kartouchová.

On December 31, 2008, the play opened at Divadlo, directed by Jiří Havlín, in the town Hluboká nad Vltavou within the Southern Bohemian District in the Czech Republic.

References

External links 
Czechoslovak Film Database
Branické divadlo Website
Kulturní portál

Comedy plays
Czech plays
Plays by Antonín Procházka
2008 plays